Ousseina D. Alidou (born March 29, 1963) is an Africanist scholar focusing on Muslim women, and a professor in the Department of African, Middle Eastern and South Asian Languages and Literature at Rutgers University. She received a Master of Arts degree in linguistics at the Université Abdou Moumouni in Niamey, Niger, and a MA degree in applied linguistics at Indiana University Bloomington where she also obtained a theoretical linguistics PhD. She was a member of the Committee for Academic Freedom in Africa and the 2022 president of the African Studies Association.

Her twin sister Hassana Alidou was Niger's ambassador to the United States from 2015 to 2019.

Awards
 2006 Rutgers University Board of Trustees Fellowship for Scholarly Excellence 
 2007 Runner-up, Aidoo-Snyder Book Prize, Women's Caucus of the African Studies Association for Engaging Modernity
 2010 Distinguished Alumni Award of the Africa-America Institute

Publications
Alidou published many scholarly articles and books including:
 A Thousand Flowers: Social struggles against structural adjustment in African universities, co-edited with Silvia Federici and George Caffentzis, Trenton, NJ: Africa World Press, 2000
 Engaging Modernity: Muslim Women and the Politics of Agency in Postcolonial Niger, Madison: University of Wisconsin Press, 2005.
 Muslim Women in Postcolonial Kenya: Leadership, Representation, and Social Change, Madison: University of Wisconsin Press, 2013.

References

1963 births
Women academics
Nigerien activists
Living people
Indiana University Bloomington alumni
Nigerien academics
Nigerien Africanists
Rutgers University faculty
Presidents of the African Studies Association